The 2002 season was the Detroit Lions' 73rd in the National Football League. It was the Lions’ inaugural season at the new Ford Field in Downtown Detroit and their first in the city since the team left Tiger Stadium after the 1974 season. Following the season, Marty Mornhinweg was fired and Steve Mariucci was hired as the Lions' head coach. The Lions entered the 2002 season looking to improve on their 2–14 record from 2001 and make the playoffs for the first time since 1999. They improved on their record, winning 3 games. However, the new stadium didn't help the team overall, and they continued to disappoint, beginning the season with three consecutive losses. By week 9, the Lions had a 3–5 record after a win over the Dallas Cowboys. However, after that win, the Lions lost their remaining 8 games to finish the season 3–13 and failed to reach the playoffs. The Lions also went 0–8 on the road for the second straight season. As a result, Marty Mornhinweg was fired after the season. In his 2 seasons as head coach, the Lions went 5–27 for a winning percentage of .156.

Offseason

NFL Draft

Undrafted free agents

Personnel

Staff

Roster

Regular season
In addition to their regular games against NFC North rivals, the Lions under the NFL's new scheduling formula played games against teams from the NFC South and from the AFC East. They also played the Dallas Cowboys and Arizona Cardinals, who had the fourth best records from 2001 of the teams placed in their respective divisions.

Schedule

Game summaries

Week 1: at Miami Dolphins

Week 2: at Carolina Panthers

Week 3: vs. Green Bay Packers

Week 4: vs. New Orleans Saints

Week 6: at Minnesota Vikings

Week 7: vs. Chicago Bears

Week 8: at Buffalo Bills

Week 9: vs. Dallas Cowboys

Week 10: at Green Bay Packers

Week 11: vs. New York Jets

Week 12: at Chicago Bears

Week 13: vs. New England Patriots

Week 14: at Arizona Cardinals

Week 15: vs. Tampa Bay Buccaneers

Week 16: at Atlanta Falcons

Week 17: vs. Minnesota Vikings

Standings

References

External links
 2002 Detroit Lions at Pro-Football-Reference.com

Detroit Lions
Detroit Lions seasons
Detroit Lions